The 318th Cyberspace Operations Group is a United States Air Force information operations unit located at Joint Base San Antonio, Texas.  The group was first activated during World War II as the 8th Photographic Reconnaissance Group.  After training in the United States, the unit moved to the China-Burma-India Theater and engaged in hostilities until the end of the war.  It returned to the United States in November 1945, and was inactivated at the port of embarkation.

The group was disbanded in 1947, but was reestablished in 1985 as the 318th Electronic Warfare Group, being renumbered to fit the Air Force's policy of numbering its operational groups and wings in a single series.  It was activated in 2000 as the 318th Information Operations Group and received its current name in 2013.

Mission
The mission of the 318th Group is to be an information warfare group, training and integrating advanced tactics, technologies, and tools arming America's warfighters with decisive information warfare combat power.

Units
 39th Information Operations Squadron
 The squadron conducts training on cyberspace operations, including operational security and deception at both the initial and advanced level.
 90th Cyberspace Operations Squadron
 The squadron produces government of the shelf (GOTS) software in support of cyber operations.
 318th Range Squadron
 The squadron designs, builds, and provides cyber ranges for test, training, mission rehearsal, and exercise.
 346th Test Squadron
 The squadron tests, evaluates and assesses cyberspace capabilities for operational forces, national agencies, the acquisition community and Department of Defense agencies.

History

World War II
The group was first activated at Peterson Field, Colorado as the 8th Photographic Reconnaissance Group on 1 October 1943, but was redesignated the 8th Photographic Group little more than a week later.  Before the end of the month, group headquarters had moved to Gainesville Army Air Field, Texas.  The group had no flying squadrons assigned, and its personnel were trained to provide photographic intelligence for air and ground forces.  In February 1944, the group headquarters left the United States for the China-Burma-India Theater.

Group headquarters arrived in India at the end of March 1944, and in April established itself at Bally Seaplane Base.  There it was assigned operational squadrons for the first time on 25 April:  
 The 9th Photographic Reconnaissance Squadron at Barrackpore Airfield, India and primarily equipped with Lockheed F-5 Lightnings
 The 20th Tactical Reconnaissance Squadron at Kisselbari, India, but operating from Dinjan Airfield, India and primarily equipped with Curtiss P-40 Warhawks
 The 24th Combat Mapping Squadron at Guskhara Airfield, India and primarily equipped with Consolidated F-7 Liberators.
Each of these squadrons maintained detachments of various sizes in India, Burma, and China and did not operate in squadron strength from a single base.

In July 1944, the 40th Photographic Reconnaissance Squadron arrived in theater and its F-5 Lightnings were stationed at Guskhara Airfield.   The group's squadrons conducted photographic reconnaissance, photographic mapping, and visual reconnaissance missions. The products the group created included maps, mosaics, terrain models, and target charts of areas in Burma, China, French Indochina and Thailand. Group aircraft conducting armed reconnaissance missions bombed and strafed enemy installations and occasionally provided fighter escort for bombers.

Shortly before the war's end, in June 1945,  the group was redesignated the 8th Reconnaissance Group. It remained in India after V-J Day.  Group headquarters and most elements departed in October 1945, while the 9th Squadron briefly remained behind in India.  Upon arrival at Camp Kilmer, New Jersey, the port of embarkation, the group was inactivated.  It was disbanded on 6 March 1947.  In 1985, the group was reconstituted and redesignated the 318th Electronic Warfare Group, but was never active under that designation.

Cyberspace operations
The group was redesignated the 318th Information Operations Group and reactivated in August 2000.  The unit took the lead in developing information operations techniques, tactics and procedures for use by the combat air forces and other agencies.

The group assumed its current designation in September 2013.

Lineage
 Constituted as  the 8th Photographic Reconnaissance Group on 15 September 1943
 Activated on 1 October 1943
 Redesignated 8th Photographic Group, Reconnaissance on 9 October 1943
 Redesignated 8th Reconnaissance Group on 15 June 1945
 inactivated on 5 November 1945
 Disbanded on 6 March 1947
 Reconstituted and redesignated 318th Electronic Warfare Group on 31 July 1985
 Redesignated 318th Information Operations Group on 17 July 2000
 Activated on 1 August 2000
 Redesignated 318th Cyberspace Operations Group on 13 September 2013

Assignments
 III Reconnaissance Command, 1 October 1943
 89th Reconnaissance Training Wing, 27 October 1943
 Tenth Air Force, c. 31 March 1944
 Army Air Forces, India-Burma Sector, China-Burma-India Theater (later Army Air Forces, India-Burma Theater), 18 July 1944
 Army Service Forces, Port of Embarkation, c. 8 October – 5 November 1945
 Air Force Information Operations Center (later 688th Information Operations Wing, 688th Cyberspace Wing), 1 August 2000 – unknown
 67th Cyberspace Wing, 2018

Components
 Squadrons
 7th Photographic Technical Squadron: c. 1 Oct 1943 – 1944
 Will Rogers Field, Oklahoma
 9th Photographic Reconnaissance Squadron: 25 April 1944 – Oct 1945
 20th Tactical Reconnaissance Squadron; 25 April 1944 – Oct 1945
 23d Information Operations Squadron: 1 August 2000 – c. 7 December 2011
 24th Combat Mapping Squadron, 25 April 1944 – September 1945
 34th Photographic Reconnaissance Squadron: 9 October 1943 – 15 January 1944
 39th Information Operations Squadron: 1 August 2000 – present
 Hurlburt Field, Florida
 40th Photographic Reconnaissance Squadron: 18 July 1944 – 2 Nov 1945
 90th Information Operations Squadron (later 90th Cyberspace Operations Squadron): 18 August 2009 – present
 92d Information Warfare Aggressor Squadron (later 92d Information Operations Squadron): 1 November 2000 – unknown
 315th Information Operations Squadron: 16 May 2005 – 12 June 2006
 318th Range Squadron: C. 1 October 2019 – present
 346th Test Squadron: 1 August 2000 – present
 453d Electronic Warfare Squadron: c. 1 August 2000 – 5 August 2009

 Other
 2d Combat Camera Unit: attached c. 18 July 1944–26 October 1944
 3d Photographic Technical Unit: 18 July 1944 – 5 November 1945
 10th Combat Camera Unit: c. 25 April 1944 – 5 November 1945

Stations
 Peterson Field, Colorado, 1 October 1943
 Gainesville Army Air Field, Texas, 26 October 1943 – 12 February 1944
 Worli, India, 31 March 1944
 Bally Seaplane Base, India, 15 April 1944 – 7 October 1945
 Camp Kilmer, New Jersey, 3 – 5 November 1945)
 Lackland Air Force Base (later Joint Base San Antonio), Texas, 1 August 2000 – present

Aircraft
 Lockheed F-5 Lightning (1944–1945)
 North American F-6 Mustang (1945)
 Consolidated F-7 Liberator(1944–1945)
 Curtiss P-40 Warhawk (1943–1945)

Awards and campaigns

See also
 List of cyber warfare forces

References

Notes
 Explanatory notes

 Citations

Bibliography

 
 

318
Military units and formations in Texas
Information operations units of the United States Air Force